Oleksa Nehrebets'kyi (real name - Leonid Dmytrenko ; born 30 October 1955, Husakove village, Cherkasy Oblast) is a dubbing director, editor and Ukrainian translator who works mainly with feature films.

Career
Nehrebets’kyi is a graduate of the biological faculty in Taras Shevchenko National University of Kyiv, 1978. In 1998-2002 he studied at the Faculty of Philology in Taras Shevchenko National University of Kyiv. From 1994 till now he is working as a writer and freelance translator.
By his efforts such famous films as Alp, Pirates of the Caribbean, Shrek, the animated series Thomas the Tank Engine & Friends, Teletubbies, the animated film Cars, Open Season, Flushed Away, The Adventures of Despereaux and Happy Feet were translated into Ukrainian. He collaborated with editing books of J. K. Rowling's Harry Potter series. In 2002-2003 he worked as a screenwriter of radio series called "The Life in distance of ten minutes”. He also translated novel wrote by David Mitchell Number 9 Dream. In 2009 he became dubbing director and author of the translation of the film Enemies of Society with Johnny Depp in the leading role.

Among his best known translations are “Coralline in the Land of Nightmares”, “Paul”, “Ted”.

Translation for cinema
 Cars
 Pirates of the Caribbean: Dead Man's Chest
 Pirates of the Caribbean: At World's End
 Charlie Wilson's War
 Children of Men
 Coralline in the Land of Nightmares
 Flushed Away
 Happy Feet
 Eragon
 I Now Pronounce You Chuck & Larry
 Harry Potter and the Order of the Phoenix
 G.I. Joe
 Madagascar 2
 Robinson Family
 Open Season
 Kung Fu Panda
 Kung Fu Panda 2
 Shrek
 Shrek Forever After
 Stardust
 The Spiderwick Chronicles
 The Holiday
 Wild Hogs
 Top

Translator and director of dubbing
 Love without rules
 You Don't Mess With the Zohan
 The Adventures of Despereaux
 Helboy: The Golden Army
 I love you, man
 Katyń
 The Unborn
 Johnny D.
 Rock wave
 Dilemma
 Paul;
 The Smurfs
 Anonym
 Arthur Christmas
 Ted and others.

TV series translation
 Thomas & Friends
 Alf
 Friends

Author of scripts
 2009 - The television series "Only Love" (1+1) - editor, dialogues author, scriptwriter of last series
 2004-2008 - Sunday poetical TV lottery "Patriot" (1st National)
 2003-2004 - Daily radio serial "Life in distance of 10 minutes"

Books translation
 Rudyard Kipling "Just so stories"
 Marina Lewycka "From Tractors to Caravan", " Various Pets Alive and Dead "
 David Mitchell "Number 9 Dream"

References

Ukrainian speculative fiction translators
Ukrainian editors
Ukrainian voice directors
1955 births
Living people